John Tonory,O.S.A.  was Bishop of Ossory  from 1566 until his death on 3 August 1576.

Tonory was nominated in December 1553 by Queen Mary I and consecrated on January 1554, but after the accession of Queen Elizabeth I he was replaced.

Notes

1565 deaths
16th-century Roman Catholic bishops in Ireland
Roman Catholic bishops of Ossory